The Deliverance is an upcoming American horror thriller film directed by Lee Daniels and written by Daniels, Elijah Bynum and David Coggeshall. The film stars Andra Day with Mo'Nique, Aunjanue Ellis, Rob Morgan, Tasha Smith, Caleb McLaughlin, Omar Epps, and Glenn Close. This film is based on the Latoya Ammons family possession. The $65 million budget production will  debut on Netflix in 2023.

Cast
 Andra Day as Ebony, the mother of an Indiana family whose children purportedly became demonically possessed
 Mo'Nique as a social worker who helps a family through a series of exorcisms
 Aunjanue Ellis
 Rob Morgan
 Tasha Smith as Asia
 Caleb McLaughlin
 Omar Epps
 Glenn Close as Morgan
 Demi Singleton
 Miss Lawrence
 Anthony B. Jenkins

Production
On January 24, 2022, it was reported that Lee Daniels will direct a $65 million movie reuniting with his The United States vs. Billie Holiday star Andra Day, who’ll star with Octavia Spencer, Glenn Close, Rob Morgan, Caleb McLaughlin and Aunjanue Ellis. On April 1, 2022, Oscar winner Mo'Nique who last worked with Daniels in the 2009 film Precious, replaced Octavia Spencer in the role. They had not spoken for 13 years. On April 14, 2022, Tasha Smith also was cast. Omar Epps, Demi Singleton, Miss Lawrence, and Anthony B. Jenkins round out the cast.

The film was shot in the summer of 2022 in Pittsburgh.

References

External links

Upcoming films
Upcoming English-language films
2023 horror films
2023 films
English-language Netflix original films
Films shot in Indiana